Speers may refer to

People 

 David Speers, Australian journalist

Places 
 Speers, Pennsylvania
 Speers, Saskatchewan
 Speers Point, New South Wales
 Speers, a town in Friesland

Music 
 Speer Family, also known as the Speers

Television
 Speers Tonight, an Australian news program

See also 
 Spears (disambiguation)
Speirs
 Speer (disambiguation)